This is a list of Canadian television related events from 1982.

Events

Debuts

Ending this year

Births 
May 16 - Melissa Altro, actress and voice actress (Arthur)
June 19 - Michael Yarmush, the original voice actor for Arthur from Seasons 1–5 on Arthur
October 29 - Chelan Simmons, actress and former model

Television shows

1950s
Country Canada (1954–2007)
The Friendly Giant (1958–1985)
Hockey Night in Canada (1952–present)
The National (1954–present)
Front Page Challenge (1957–1995)
Wayne and Shuster Show (1958–1989)

1960s
CTV National News (1961–present)
Land and Sea (1964–present)
Man Alive (1967–2000)
Mr. Dressup (1967–1996)
The Nature of Things (1960–present, scientific documentary series)
Question Period (1967–present, news program)
Reach for the Top (1961–1985)
Take 30 (1962–1983)
The Tommy Hunter Show (1965–1992)
University of the Air (1966–1983)
W-FIVE (1966–present, newsmagazine program)

1970s
The Beachcombers (1972–1990)
Canada AM (1972–present, news program)
Celebrity Cooks (1975–1984)
City Lights (1973–1989)
Definition (1974–1989)
the fifth estate (1975–present, newsmagazine program)
Headline Hunters (1972–1983)
Let's Go (1976–1984)
The Littlest Hobo (1979–1985)Live It Up! (1978–1990)The Mad Dash (1978–1985)Marketplace (1972–present, newsmagazine program)Read All About It! (1979–1983)Second City Television (1976–1984)Smith & Smith (1979–1985)You Can't Do That on Television (1979–1990)V.I.P. (1973–1983)100 Huntley Street (1977–present, religious program)

1980sThe Alan Thicke Show (1980–1983)Bizarre (1980–1985)The Frantics (1981–1984)Hangin' In (1981–1987)Home Fires (1980–1983)Seeing Things (1981–1987)Switchback (1981–1990)Thrill of a Lifetime (1981–1987)

TV moviesBecoming LauraBlind FaithBy Reason of InsanityHigh CardAn Honourable Member''

Television stations

Debuts

See also
1982 in Canada
List of Canadian films of 1982

References